In the early morning hours of March 18, 1990, thirteen works of art were stolen from the Isabella Stewart Gardner Museum in Boston. Guards admitted two men posing as police officers responding to a disturbance call, and the thieves tied the guards up and looted the museum over the next hour. The case is unsolved; no arrests have been made and no works have been recovered. The stolen works have been valued at hundreds of millions of dollars by the FBI and art dealers. The museum is offering a $10 million reward for information leading to the art's recovery, the largest bounty ever offered by a private institution.

The stolen works were originally procured by art collector Isabella Stewart Gardner (1840–1924) and intended for permanent display at the museum with the rest of her collection. Among them was The Concert, one of only 34 known paintings by Johannes Vermeer and thought to be the most valuable unrecovered painting in the world. Also missing is The Storm on the Sea of Galilee, Rembrandt's only seascape. Other paintings and sketches by Rembrandt, Edgar Degas, Édouard Manet, and Govert Flinck were stolen, along with a relatively valueless eagle finial and Chinese gu. Experts were puzzled by the choice of artwork, since more valuable works were left untouched. The collection and its layout are permanent, so empty frames remain hanging both in homage to the missing works and as placeholders for their return.

The FBI believes that the robbery was planned by a criminal organization. The case lacks strong physical evidence, and the FBI has largely depended on interrogations, undercover informants, and sting operations to collect information. They have focused primarily on the Boston Mafia, which was in the midst of an internal gang war during the period. One theory is that gangster Bobby Donati organized it to negotiate for his caporegime's release from prison; Donati was murdered a year after the robbery. Other accounts suggest that the paintings were stolen by a gang in Boston's Dorchester neighborhood, though they deny involvement even after a sting operation put some of them in prison. All have denied any knowledge or have given leads that were fruitless, despite being offered reward money, reduced prison sentences, and even freedom if they gave information leading to recovery of the art.

Background
The Isabella Stewart Gardner Museum was constructed under the guidance of art collector Isabella Stewart Gardner (1840–1924) to house her personal art collection. The museum opened to the public in 1903, and Gardner continued to expand the collection and arrange it until she died in 1924. She left the museum with a $3.6 million endowment, and her will stipulated that the arrangement of the artwork should not be altered and no items were to be sold or bought into the collection.

By the 1980s, the museum was running low on funds. This financial strain left the museum in poor condition; it lacked a climate control system and an insurance policy, and was in need of basic building maintenance. After the FBI uncovered a plot by Boston criminals to rob the museum in 1982, the museum allocated funds to improve security. Among these improvements were sixty infrared motion detectors and a closed-circuit television system consisting of four cameras placed around the building's perimeter. There were no cameras installed within as the board of trustees thought installing such equipment in the historical building would be too expensive. More security guards were hired as well. Despite these security improvements, the only way police could be summoned to the museum was with a button at the security desk. Other museums at the time had fail-safe systems which required night watchmen to make hourly phone calls to the police to indicate all was well.

An independent security consultant reviewed the museum's operations in 1988 and determined they were on par with most other museums, but recommended improvements. The security director at the Museum of Fine Arts in Boston also suggested security upgrades to the museum. Because of the museum's financial strain and Isabella Stewart Gardner's wishes against any major renovations, the board of trustees did not approve these security enhancements. The board also denied a request from the security director for higher guard salaries in a bid to attract more qualified applicants for the job. The current guards were paid slightly above minimum wage. The security flaws of the museum were an open secret among the guards.

Robbery

Prelude
The robbery occurred in the early hours of Sunday, March 18, 1990. The thieves were first witnessed around 12:30a.m. by several St. Patrick's Day revelers leaving a party near the museum. The two men were disguised as police officers and parked in a hatchback on Palace Road, about a hundred feet from the side entrance. The witnesses believed them to be policemen.

The museum guards on duty that night were Rick Abath, age 23, and Randy Hestand, age 25; Abath was a regular night watchman and it was Hestand's first time on the night shift. The security policy maintained that one guard patrolled the galleries with a flashlight and walkie-talkie, while the other sat at the security desk. Abath went on patrol first. During his patrol, fire alarms sounded off in different rooms in the museum, but he could not locate any fire or smoke. Abath returned to the security room where the fire alarm control panel indicated smoke in multiple rooms. He assumed some type of malfunction and shut down the panel. He went back on patrol and before he completed his rounds, made a quick stop at the side entrance of the museum, briefly opening the side door and shutting it again. He did not tell Hestand he was doing this or why. Abath completed his tour and returned to the security desk around 1:00a.m., at which point Hestand began his rounds.

Guards are subdued
At 1:20a.m., the thieves drove up to the side entrance, parked, and walked up to the side door. They rang the buzzer, which connected them to Abath through an intercom. They explained to Abath that they were police investigating a disturbance and needed to be buzzed in. Abath could see them on the closed-circuit television wearing what appeared to be police uniforms. He was not aware of any disturbance, but theorized that as it was St. Patrick's Day, perhaps a reveler had climbed over the fence and someone had seen and reported it. Abath let the men in at 1:24a.m.

The thieves were let into a locked foyer that separated the side door from the museum. They approached Abath at his desk and asked if anyone else was in the museum and to bring them down; Abath radioed Hestand to return to the security desk. Abath noticed around this time that the mustache on the taller man appeared fake. The shorter man told Abath that he looked familiar, that they may have a warrant for his arrest, and to come out from behind the desk and provide identification. Abath complied, stepping away from the desk where the only panic button to alert police was. The shorter man forced Abath against a wall, spread his legs and handcuffed him. Hestand walked into the room around this time, and the taller thief turned him around and handcuffed him. Once both guards were handcuffed, the thieves revealed their true intentions to rob the museum and asked the guards not to give them any problems.

The thieves wrapped duct tape around the heads and eyes of the guards. Without asking for directions, they led the guards into the basement where they were handcuffed to a steam pipe and workbench. The thieves examined the wallets of the guards and explained that they knew where they lived, not to tell authorities anything and they would get a reward in about a year. It took the thieves less than fifteen minutes to subdue the guards; it was now about 1:35a.m.

Stealing the works

The thieves' movements through the museum were recorded on infrared motion detectors. Steps in the first room they entered, the Dutch Room on the second floor, were not recorded until 1:48a.m. This was 13 minutes after they finished subduing the guards, perhaps waiting to make sure no police were alerted.

As the thieves approached the paintings in the Dutch Room, a device began beeping that would normally trip when a patron was too close to a painting. The thieves smashed it. They took The Storm on the Sea of Galilee and A Lady and Gentleman in Black and threw them on the marble floor which shattered their glass frames. Using a blade, they cut the canvases out of their stretchers. They also removed a large Rembrandt self-portrait oil painting from the wall but left it leaning against a cabinet. Investigators believe they may have considered it too large to transport, potentially because it was painted on wood, not more durable canvas like the others. Instead, the thieves took a small postage stamp-sized self-portrait etching by Rembrandt on display beneath the larger portrait. On the right side of the room, they removed Landscape with Obelisk and The Concert from their frames. The final piece taken from the room was an ancient Chinese gu.

At 1:51a.m., while one thief continued working in the Dutch Room, the other entered a narrow hallway dubbed the Short Gallery on the other end of the second floor. The other thief joined soon. In this room, they began removing screws for a frame displaying a Napoleonic flag, likely an effort to steal the flag. They appeared to have given up partway through as not all the screws were removed, and ultimately only took the exposed eagle finial atop the flagpole. They also took five Degas sketches from the room. The last work stolen was Chez Tortoni from the Blue Room on the first floor. The museum's motion detectors did not detect any motion within the Blue Room during the thieves' time in the building. The only footsteps detected in the room that night were Abath's during the two times he passed through the gallery on his patrol earlier.

As they prepared to leave, the thieves checked on the guards one last time and asked if they were comfortable. They then moved to the security director's office where they took the video cassettes that recorded their entrance on the closed-circuit cameras, and the data print-outs from the motion detecting equipment. The movement data was also captured on a hard drive, which remained untouched. The frame for Chez Tortoni was left at the security director's desk. The thieves then moved to take the artwork out of the museum; the side entrance doors were opened once at 2:40a.m. and again for the last time at 2:45a.m. The robbery lasted 81 minutes.

The next shift of guards arrived later in the morning and realized something was amiss when they could not establish contact with anyone inside to be let in. They called the security director who, upon entering the building with his keys, found nobody at the watch desk and called police. The police searched the building and found the guards still tied in the basement.

Stolen artwork

Thirteen works were stolen. In 1990, the FBI estimated the value of the haul at $200 million and raised this estimate to $500 million by 2000. In the late 2000s, some art dealers suggested the haul could be worth $600 million. It is considered the highest-value museum robbery.

The most valuable works were taken from the Dutch Room. Among these was The Concert by Dutch painter Vermeer (1632–75), one of only 34 paintings attributed to him. The painting accounts for half of the haul's value, estimated at $250 million in 2015. Experts believe it may be the most valuable stolen object in the world. In the same room, the thieves targeted works by Dutch painter Rembrandt (1606–69). These included The Storm on the Sea of Galilee, his only seascape and the most valuable of his works stolen that night. Estimates have placed its value at about $140 million since the robbery. The other Rembrandt works taken were A Lady and Gentleman in Black and a small postage stamp-sized self-portrait etching. The latter was previously stolen and returned in 1970. The thieves may have taken Landscape with Obelisk believing it was a Rembrandt; it was long attributed to him until it was quietly credited to his pupil Govert Flinck (1615–60) a few years before the heist. Traditionally used for serving wine in ancient China, the beaker was one of the oldest works in the museum, dating to the Shang Dynasty in the 12th century BC. Its estimated value is only several thousand dollars.

In the Short Gallery, five sketches by French artist Edgar Degas (1834–1917) were stolen. They were each done on paper less than a square foot in size and made with pencils, inks, washes, and charcoal. They are of relatively little value compared with the other stolen works, worth under $100,000 combined. Also taken was a  French Imperial Eagle finial from the corner of a framed flag for Napoleon's Imperial Guard. There is a $100,000 reward for information leading to the return of the finial alone. It possibly appeared like gold to the thieves. Chez Tortoni by French painter Édouard Manet (1832–1883) was taken from the Blue Room; it was the only item taken from the first floor.

The eclectic mix of items has puzzled experts. While some of the paintings were valuable, the thieves passed other valuable works by Raphael, Botticelli, and Michelangelo and left them undisturbed, opting to take relatively valueless items like the gu and finial. The thieves never entered the third floor where Titian's The Rape of Europa hung, one of the most valuable paintings in the city. The selection of works and the brutish ways the thieves handled the artwork has led investigators to believe the thieves were not experts commissioned to steal particular works.

As Gardner's will decreed nothing in her collection should be moved, the empty frames for the stolen paintings remain hanging in their respective locations in the museum as placeholders for their potential return. Because of the museum's low funds and lack of an insurance policy, the director solicited help from Sotheby's and Christie's auction houses to post a reward of $1 million within three days. This was increased to $5 million in 1997. In 2017, it was doubled to $10 million with an expiration date set for the end of the year. This reward was extended following an outpouring of tips from the public. It is the largest bounty ever offered by a private institution. The reward is for "information that leads directly to the recovery of all of [their] items in good condition". Federal prosecutors have stated that anyone who willingly returns the items will not be prosecuted. The statute of limitations expired in 1995 as well, so the thieves and anyone who participated in the theft cannot be prosecuted.

Early leads and people of interest

The Federal Bureau of Investigation took immediate control of the case on the grounds that the artwork could likely cross state lines. Investigators have called the case unique for its lack of strong physical evidence. The thieves did not leave behind footprints or hair, and it is inconclusive if the fingerprints left at the scene were from the thieves or museum employees. The FBI has done some DNA analysis in the years following as advancements in the field grew. Some of the evidence has been lost among their files.

Rick Abath
Security guard Rick Abath was investigated early on because of his suspicious behavior on the night of the theft. When on his patrol, Abath briefly opened and shut a side door, a move which some believe could have been a signal to the thieves parked outside. Abath told authorities that he did this routinely to ensure the door was locked. One of Abath's colleagues told journalists that if Abath had opened the door routinely as he maintains, supervisors would have seen it on computer printouts and put a stop to it. More suspicion has been drawn from the museum's motion detectors, which did not detect any movement in the Blue Room (which housed Chez Tortoni) during the 81 minutes the thieves were in the museum. The only footsteps in the room that night were Abath's during his security patrol. A security consultant reviewed the motion detector equipment several weeks after the theft, and determined they were operating correctly. Abath maintains his innocence, and the FBI agent overseeing the case in its early years concluded the guards were too incompetent and foolish to have pulled off the crime.

In 2015, the FBI released a security video from the museum on the night before the theft, showing Abath buzzing in an unidentified man into the museum to converse at the security desk. Abath told investigators he could not recall the incident or recognize the man, and so the FBI requested the public's assistance. Several former museum guards came forward and said the stranger was Abath's boss, the museum's deputy security chief.

Whitey Bulger 
Whitey Bulger was one of the most powerful crime bosses in Boston during the era, heading the Winter Hill Gang. He claimed he did not organize the heist, and in fact sent his agents out in an attempt to determine who did because the robbery was committed on his "turf" and he wanted to be paid tribute.

FBI agent Thomas McShane investigated Bulger to determine his involvement. He determined that Bulger's strong ties with the Boston Police could explain how the thieves acquired legitimate police uniforms, or perhaps that real police were arranged to pull off the heist. Bulger also had relations with the Irish Republican Army (IRA). McShane identified the bogus tripping of the fire alarm ahead of the heist a "calling card" of the IRA and the rival Ulster Volunteer Force (UVF). Both organizations had agents in Boston at the time, and both had demonstrated capability in the past of pulling off art heists. McShane's investigation of Bulger and the IRA did not produce any evidence to tie them to the theft. According to Charley Hill, a retired art and antiquities investigator for Scotland Yard, Bulger gave the Gardner works to the IRA and they are most likely in Ireland.

1994 letter to the museum 
In 1994, museum director Anne Hawley received an anonymous letter from someone who claimed to be attempting to negotiate a return of the artwork. The writer explained that they were a third-party negotiator and did not know the identity of the thieves. They explained that the artwork was stolen to reduce a prison sentence, but as the opportunity had passed, there was no longer a motive to keep the artwork and they wanted to negotiate a return. The writer explained that the artwork was being held in a "non-common law country" under climate-controlled conditions. They wanted immunity for themselves and all others involved, and $2.6 million for return of the artwork, which would be sent to an offshore bank account at the same time the art was handed over. If the museum was interested in negotiating, they should print a coded message in The Boston Globe. To establish credence, the writer conveyed information only known by the museum and FBI at the time.

Hawley felt this was a strong lead. She contacted the FBI, who then contacted the Globe and the coded message was printed on May 1, 1994, edition of The Boston Globe. Hawley received a second letter a few days later in which the writer acknowledged the museum was interested in negotiating, but that they had become fearful of what they perceived was a massive investigation by federal and state authorities to determine their identity. The writer explained that they needed time to evaluate their options, but Hawley never heard from the writer again.

Brian McDevitt
Brian McDevitt was a conman from Boston who tried to rob The Hyde Collection in Glens Falls, New York in 1981. He dressed up as a FedEx driver, carried handcuffs and duct tape, and planned to steal a Rembrandt. He was also a known flag aficionado, and fit the description of the larger robber except for his thinning red hair. These parallels to the Gardner case fascinated the FBI so they interviewed him in late 1990. McDevitt denied any involvement and refused to take a polygraph test. The FBI ran his fingerprints which did not match any of those at the crime scene. McDevitt later moved to California and conned his way into television and film writing. He died in 2004.

Investigation of the Boston Mafia

Merlino gang 
The FBI announced significant progress in their investigation in March 2013. They reported "with a high degree of confidence" that they identified the thieves, which they believed were members of a criminal organization based in the mid-Atlantic and New England. They also felt "with that same confidence" that the artwork was transported to Connecticut and Philadelphia in the years following the theft, with an attempted sale in Philadelphia in 2002. Their knowledge of what happened after that is limited, and they requested the public's help to locate and return the artwork. In 2015, the FBI stated both thieves were deceased. Though the FBI did not publicly identify any individuals, sources familiar with the investigation said they were associated with a gang from Dorchester. The gang was loyal to Boston Mafia boss Frank Salemme and ran their operations out of an automobile repair shop run by criminal Carmello Merlino.

Merlino's associates may have gained knowledge of the museum's weaknesses after gangster Louis Royce cased it as early as 1981. He devised plans with an associate to light up smoke bombs and rush the galleries amidst the confusion. In 1982, when undercover FBI agents were investigating Royce and his associates for an unrelated art theft, they learned of their interest in robbing the Gardner Museum and warned the museum of the gang's plan. Royce was in prison at the time of the robbery. Royce shared his plan with others and believes associate Stephen Rossetti may have ordered the robbery or shared it with someone else.

Robert Guarente and Robert Gentile 
Among those associated with the Merlino gang were Robert Guarente and Manchester, Connecticut, gangster Robert Gentile. Guarente died from cancer in 2004, but his widow Elene told the FBI in 2010 that her husband had previously owned some of the paintings. She claimed that when her husband got sick with cancer in the early 2000s, he gave the paintings to Gentile for safekeeping. Gentile denied the accusations, claiming he was never given them and knew nothing of their whereabouts. Federal authorities indicted Gentile on drug charges in 2012, likely in an attempt to pressure Gentile for information about the Gardner works. He submitted to a polygraph test which indicated he was lying when he denied any knowledge of the theft or location of the artwork. Gentile maintained he was telling the truth and demanded a retest. During the retest he said Elene had once shown him the missing Rembrandt self-portrait, to which the polygraph machine indicated he was telling the truth. Gentile's lawyer felt that the veracity of Gentile's claims were being affected by the large presence of federal agents, and requested a smaller meeting in hopes that it would get Gentile to speak honestly. In the more intimate meeting, Gentile maintained that he did not have any information.

A few days later, the FBI stormed Gentile's house in Manchester with a search warrant. The FBI found a secret ditch beneath a false floor in the backyard shed, but found it empty. Gentile's son explained that the ditch flooded a few years prior and his father was upset about whatever was stored there. In the basement, they found a copy of the Boston Herald from March 1990 reporting the theft along with a piece of paper indicating what each piece might sell for on the black market. Beyond this, no conclusive evidence was found to indicate he ever had the paintings. Gentile went to prison for 30 months on drug charges. If he knew information about the theft, at no point did he opt to share it, which would have reduced his sentence or freed him from prison. After getting out of prison, he spoke with investigative reporter Stephen Kurkjian, claiming he was framed by the FBI. He explained how the imprisonment was detrimental to his finances and personal life. He also explained that the list found in his basement was written up by a criminal trying to broker return of the works from Guarente and was talking to Gentile as an intermediary. When asked about what could have been in the ditch, Gentile could not recall but believed it could have been small motors.

David Turner 
David Turner was another associate of Merlino. The FBI began investigating him in 1992 when a source told them Turner had access to the paintings. Merlino was arrested that same year for cocaine trafficking and told authorities that he could return the paintings for a reduced prison sentence. He asked Turner to track down the paintings; Turner failed to though he heard they were in a church in South Boston. Another associate arrested in the drug sting told authorities about Turner's involvement in several break-ins, but never mentioned the Gardner heist. Based on conversations with Merlino after his release from prison in the mid 1990s, authorities gathered that Merlino never had direct access to the paintings but possibly could broker for their return.

Despite his claims of innocence, the FBI believes he may have been one of the thieves. Evidence indicates that he went to Florida to pick up a cocaine order just days before the heist, and credit card records suggest he remained there through the night of the robbery, but some investigators believe this may have been Turner's attempt at creating an alibi. The FBI thinks the other thief was his friend and Merlino associate George Reissfelder. He died in July 1991. No clues were found in his apartment or the homes of friends and relatives, but his siblings recall a painting similar to Chez Tortoni in his bedroom. Investigators believe he looks similar to the slimmer man in the police sketches.

In 1999, the FBI arrested Turner, Merlino, Rossetti, and others in a sting operation the day they planned to rob a Loomis Fargo vault. When the FBI brought Turner in for questioning, they told him they had information that he participated in the Gardner robbery, and that if he returned the paintings, they would let him go. He told the authorities he did not know who stole the paintings nor where they could be hidden. In his 2001 trial, he claimed entrapment, that the FBI let the Loomis Fargo plot proceed so they could pressure him for information about the Gardner paintings. The jury found him guilty and he was sent to prison. Turner knew Gentile through Guarente, and in 2010, wrote a letter to Gentile asking if he could call Turner's former girlfriend to assist in recovering the Gardner paintings. In cooperation with the FBI, Gentile spoke with Turner's girlfriend, and she told him that Turner wanted him to speak with two of his ex-convict friends in Boston. The FBI wanted Gentile to meet the men and send an FBI undercover agent with him, but Gentile did not want to cooperate further. Turner was freed in November 2019, one month after Stephen Rossetti. Merlino died in prison in 2005.

Bobby Donati 

Criminal Bobby Donati was murdered in 1991 in the midst of a gang war within the Patriarca crime family. His involvement in the Gardner theft was suspected after notorious New England art thief Myles J. Connor Jr. spoke with authorities. Connor was in jail at the time of the heist, but he believed Donati and criminal David Houghton were the masterminds. Connor had worked with Donati in past art heists, and claimed the two cased the Gardner Museum where Donati took interest in the finial. Connor also claimed that Houghton visited him in jail after the heist and said that he and Donati organized it and were going to use the paintings to get Connor out of jail. If this is true, they likely borrowed the idea from Connor as he returned art to reduce sentences in the past. Even though Donati's and Houghton's appearances did not fit the witness descriptions, Connor suggested they probably hired lower-level gangsters to carry out the robbery. Like Donati, Houghton also died within two years of the robbery, though from an illness rather than murder. Connor told investigators he could assist in returning the Gardner works in exchange for the museum's posted reward and his freedom. When investigators did not give into Connor's demands because of lack of evidence, he suggested they speak with criminal and antiques dealer William P. Youngworth.

Acting on Connor's lead, the FBI opened a case on Youngworth and conducted raids on his home and antique store properties in the 1990s. The raids caught the attention of journalist Tom Mashberg, who began talking with Youngworth in 1997 about the theft. One night in August 1997, Youngworth called Mashberg and told him he had proof he could return the Gardner paintings under the right conditions. That night, Youngworth picked up Mashberg from the Boston Herald offices and drove him to a warehouse in Red Hook, Brooklyn. Youngworth led him inside to a storage unit with several large cylinder tubes. He removed one painting from its tube, unfurled it, and showed it to Mashberg under flashlight. It appeared to Mashberg to be The Storm on the Sea of Galilee. He noticed cracking along the canvas and the edges were cut in a manner consistent with the museum's reports, as well as Rembrandt's signature on the ship's rudder. Mashberg wrote about his experience in the Boston Herald, leaving out details to hide Youngworth's identity and the painting's location. He reported that his "informant" (presumably Youngworth) told him the robbery was pulled off by five men and identified two: Donati was one of the robbers, and Houghton was responsible with moving the art to a safe house. The FBI discovered the location of the warehouse several months later and raided it, finding nothing.

The veracity of Youngworth's claims and the authenticity of the painting shown to Mashberg is disputed. Youngworth supplied paint chips to Mashberg, and federal authorities reported that they were indeed from Rembrandt's era, but did not match oils used for The Storm on the Sea of Galilee. The way Mashberg described the painting as being "unfurled" has also been scrutinized, as the stolen painting was covered with a heavy varnish that would not roll easily. Federal authorities and the museum began working with Youngworth after Mashberg's story was published, but Youngworth made negotiations difficult.  He would not work with authorities unless his demands could be met, which included full immunity and Connor's release from jail. The authorities were skeptical of Youngworth's veracity, and only offered partial immunity. The United States attorney overseeing the case eventually ceased talks with Youngworth unless he could provide more reliable evidence that he had access to the Gardner works. Youngworth again provided a vial of paint chips, purportedly from The Storm on the Sea of Galilee, and 25 color photographs of the painting and A Lady and Gentleman in Black. A joint statement from the museum and federal investigators announced that the chips were not from the stolen Rembrandts, though they did test as being from 17th century paintings and could potentially be from The Concert.

In 2014, investigative reporter Stephen Kurkjian wrote to gangster Vincent Ferrara, Donati's superior during the gang war, inquiring if he had information about the Gardner theft. He received a call back from an associate of Ferrara who explained the FBI was wrong in suspecting the Merlino gang's involvement and claimed that Donati organized the robbery. The caller explained that Donati visited Ferrara in jail about three months before the theft, after the latter was charged for murder, and told Ferrara that he was going to do something to get him out of jail. Three months later, Ferrara heard news about the Gardner theft, after which Donati visited him again and confirmed to Ferrara that he was involved in the robbery. He claimed to have buried the artwork and would start a negotiation for his release once the investigation cooled down. The negotiations never occurred because Donati was murdered. Kurkjian believes Donati was motivated to free Ferrara from prison because Ferrara could protect him in the gang war. A friend of Guarente also corroborated that Donati organized the robbery, and that Donati gave paintings to Guarente when he became concerned for his own safety. Donati was close friends with Guarente. The two were seen at a social club in Revere shortly before the robbery with a bag of police uniforms.

In popular culture 
Fictional accounts of the robbery and what occurred to the paintings were explored on television shows Blindspot, The Blacklist, The Venture Bros., Shameless and The Simpsons, as well as the novels The Art Forger (2012) by B.A. Shapiro, Artful Deception (2012) by James J. McGovern, Charlesgate Confidential (2018) by Scott Von Doviak, The Hidden Things (2019) by Jamie Mason, The Mob Zone (2020) by Joseph DeMatteo, A Discerning Eye (2020) by Carol Orange, The Secrets of Alias Matthew Goldman (2021) by Susan Grundy, Mister Impossible (2021) by Maggie Stiefvater, and The Midnight Ride (2022) by Ben Mezrich.

In the 2007 episode of the TV series Monk, The Concert by Vermeer can be seen hanging on the wall of art thief Hal Tucker's (Andy Richter) apartment.

On 13 February 2008, CNBC aired an episode titled "Unsolved: $300 Million Art Heist" (Season 2, Episode 3) of their documentary series American Greed.

In October 2020, BBC Four released a documentary about searching for the art titled The Billion Dollar Art Hunt. 

In April 2021, Netflix released an original four-part documentary series about the theft, This Is a Robbery: The World's Biggest Art Heist.

In the HBO Max DC TV series Harley Quinn, Selina Kyle is responsible for the theft, as discovered by Clayface.

In Cobra Kai season 5, episode 10, Rembrandt's Storm on the Sea of Galilee is seen hanging in Terry Silver's apartment.

Explanatory notes

Citations

General and cited references

External links

Gardner Museum's theft page
FBI's theft page
Last Seen podcast series by WBUR

1990 crimes in the United States
1990 in Boston
American Mafia events
Art crime
Crimes in Massachusetts
Individual thefts
March 1990 crimes
March 1990 events in the United States
Museum crime
Patriarca crime family
Robberies in the United States
Unsolved crimes in the United States